The enzyme UDP-glucose 4-epimerase, also known as UDP-galactose 4-epimerase or GALE, is a homodimeric epimerase found in bacterial, fungal, plant, and mammalian cells. This enzyme performs the final step in the Leloir pathway of galactose metabolism, catalyzing the reversible conversion of UDP-galactose to UDP-glucose. GALE tightly binds nicotinamide adenine dinucleotide (NAD+), a co-factor required for catalytic activity.

Additionally, human and some bacterial GALE isoforms reversibly catalyze the formation of UDP-N-acetylgalactosamine (UDP-GalNAc) from UDP-N-acetylglucosamine (UDP-GlcNAc) in the presence of NAD+, an initial step in glycoprotein or glycolipid synthesis.

Historical significance 

Dr. Luis Leloir deduced the role of GALE in galactose metabolism during his tenure at the Instituto de Investigaciones Bioquímicas del Fundación Campomar, initially terming the enzyme waldenase. Dr. Leloir was awarded the 1970 Nobel Prize in Chemistry for his discovery of sugar nucleotides and their role in the biosynthesis of carbohydrates.

Structure 

GALE belongs to the short-chain dehydrogenase/reductase (SDR) superfamily of proteins. This family is characterized by a conserved Tyr-X-X-X-Lys motif necessary for enzymatic activity; one or more Rossmann fold scaffolds; and the ability to bind NAD+.

Tertiary structure 
GALE structure has been resolved for a number of species, including E. coli and humans. GALE exists as a homodimer in various species.

While subunit size varies from 68 amino acids (Enterococcus faecalis) to 564 amino acids (Rhodococcus jostii), a majority of GALE subunits cluster near 330 amino acids in length. Each subunit contains two distinct domains. An N-terminal domain contains a 7-stranded parallel β-pleated sheet flanked by α-helices. Paired Rossmann folds within this domain allow GALE to tightly bind one NAD+ cofactor per subunit. A 6-stranded β-sheet and 5 α-helices comprise GALE's C-terminal domain. C-terminal residues bind UDP, such that the subunit is responsible for correctly positioning UDP-glucose or UDP-galactose for catalysis.

Active site
The cleft between GALE's N- and C-terminal domains constitutes the enzyme's active site. A conserved Tyr-X-X-X Lys motif is necessary for GALE catalytic activity; in humans, this motif is represented by Tyr 157-Gly-Lys-Ser-Lys 161, while E. coli GALE contains Tyr 149-Gly-Lys-Ser-Lys 153. The size and shape of GALE's active site varies across species, allowing for variable GALE substrate specificity. Additionally, the conformation of the active site within a species-specific GALE is malleable; for instance, a bulky UDP-GlcNAc 2' N-acetyl group is accommodated within the human GALE active site by the rotation of the Asn 207 carboxamide side chain.

Mechanism

Conversion of UDP-galactose to UDP-glucose 
GALE inverts the configuration of the 4' hydroxyl group of UDP-galactose through a series of 4 steps. Upon binding UDP-galactose, a conserved tyrosine residue in the active site abstracts a proton from the 4' hydroxyl group.

Concomitantly, the 4' hydride is added to the si-face of NAD+, generating NADH and a 4-ketopyranose intermediate. The 4-ketopyranose intermediate rotates 180° about the pyrophosphoryl linkage between the glycosyl oxygen and β-phosphorus atom, presenting the opposite face of the ketopyranose intermediate to NADH. Hydride transfer from NADH to this opposite face inverts the stereochemistry of the 4' center. The conserved tyrosine residue then donates its proton, regenerating the 4' hydroxyl group.

Conversion of UDP-GlcNAc to UDP-GalNAc 
Human and some bacterial GALE isoforms reversibly catalyze the conversion of UDP-GlcNAc to UDP-GalNAc through an identical mechanism, inverting the stereochemical configuration at the sugar's 4' hydroxyl group.

Biological function

Galactose metabolism
No direct catabolic pathways exist for galactose metabolism. Galactose is therefore preferentially converted into glucose-1-phosphate, which may be shunted into glycolysis or the inositol synthesis pathway.

GALE functions as one of four enzymes in the Leloir pathway of galactose conversion of glucose-1-phosphate. First, galactose mutarotase converts β-D-galactose to α-D-galactose. Galactokinase then phosphorylates α-D-galactose at the 1' hydroxyl group, yielding galactose-1-phosphate. In the third step, galactose-1-phosphate uridyltransferase catalyzes the reversible transfer of a UMP moiety from UDP-glucose to galactose-1-phosphate, generating UDP-galactose and glucose-1-phosphate. In the final Leloir step, UDP-glucose is regenerated from UDP-galactose by GALE; UDP-glucose cycles back to the third step of the pathway. As such, GALE regenerates a substrate necessary for continued Leloir pathway cycling.

The glucose-1-phosphate generated in step 3 of the Leloir pathway may be isomerized to glucose-6-phosphate by phosphoglucomutase. Glucose-6-phosphate readily enters glycolysis, leading to the production of ATP and pyruvate. Furthermore, glucose-6-phosphate may be converted to inositol-1-phosphate by inositol-3-phosphate synthase, generating a precursor needed for inositol biosynthesis.

UDP-GalNAc synthesis 
Human and selected bacterial GALE isoforms bind UDP-GlcNAc, reversibly catalyzing its conversion to UDP-GalNAc. A family of glycosyltransferases known as UDP-N-acetylgalactosamine:polypeptide N-acetylgalactosamine transferases (ppGaNTases) transfers GalNAc from UDP-GalNAc to glycoprotein serine and threonine residues. ppGaNTase-mediated glycosylation regulates protein sorting, ligand signaling, resistance to proteolytic attack, and represents the first committed step in mucin biosynthesis.

Role in disease 

Human GALE deficiency or dysfunction results in Type III galactosemia, which may exist in a mild (peripheral) or more severe (generalized) form.

References

Further reading

External links
  GeneReviews/NCBI/NIH/UW entry on Epimerase Deficiency Galactosemia
  OMIM entries on Epimerase Deficiency Galactosemia  
 

EC 5.1.3
Enzymes of known structure
NADH-dependent enzymes